Joyce Watson FNZIC (5 July 1918 – 28 September 2004) was a New Zealand chemist specialising in fruit disorders and trace elements.

Academic career

Watson was born in Nelson in 1918, the daughter of Helen "Nellie" Knaggs Watson (1883–1956) and Francis George Watson (1887–1957). She received her education at Christchurch Girls' High School. After a BSc in 1939, Watson completed an MSc titled A phase rule investigation of the three component system BaO–(CH3CO)2O–H2O at 25°C and 35°C  in 1940 at Canterbury College, then part of the University of New Zealand. She then moved to the Cawthron Institute in 1941, where she was employed as an assistant pasture chemist.

Watson's research began with investigating the disorders of fruit caused by trace element deficiencies, and progressed into tomatoes, pasture, hops, flax and tobacco. Watson's work on the fruit disorder bitter pit led to the discovery that the cause is calcium deficiency. Calcium sprays are still used to prevent the disorder.

When takahē were rediscovered in 1948, Watson was tasked by the Wildlife Service with analysing the tussock to assist with captive rearing and to discover whether the application of fertiliser might improve bird health. The work may have led to the application of nitrogen and phosphorus to the tussock.

Watson died on 28 September 2004 at the Omaio Village Rest Home in Nelson.

Recognition 
In 1971 Watson was made a Fellow of the New Zealand Institute of Chemistry, an honour bestowed on only three other women by that point.

In 2017, Watson was selected as one of the Royal Society Te Apārangi's 150 women in 150 words.

Selected works

References

New Zealand women chemists
People associated with the Cawthron Institute
1918 births
2004 deaths
University of Canterbury alumni
Fellows of the New Zealand Institute of Chemistry
People from Nelson, New Zealand
People educated at Christchurch Girls' High School